Ambrogio Beretta (3 March 1905 – 14 February 1988) was an Italian cyclist. He competed in the individual and team road race events at the 1928 Summer Olympics.

References

External links
 

1905 births
1988 deaths
Italian male cyclists
Olympic cyclists of Italy
Cyclists at the 1928 Summer Olympics
Cyclists from Turin
20th-century Italian people